The 2012 MTV Video Music Brazil, known as VMB 2012 in Brazil, was held on September 20, 2012, and yook place at the Espaço das Américas, São Paulo. It awarded the best in Brazilian music and popular culture in the year of 2012.

With 'street culture' as the awards theme, the VMB 2012 overcame the previous edition as the greatest VMB ever. The event had an audience of 4000 people, and it was four hours long, one hour for the pre-show, two for the main show, and one for after-show, like the previous editions. As the 2011 Video Music Awards, the awards, for the first time, didn't have a host.

For this edition, some concepts of the previous edition was maintained. It was continue to emphasize the alternative scenario of Brazilian music, but, this time, the popular one gained more space. Some popular artists returned to be indicated, like the happy rock band Restart, winner of 5 categories in 2010.

The voting was also reformulated. New categories were created: Best Band, Best Female and Best Male Act. The public has regained emphasis and chose the finalists in each category until September 3. From there, the VMB academy chose the winners. The exceptions were the categories Hit of the Year and International Artist, which were exclusively by popular vote.

Nominations
The nominees were revealed on July 20, 2012. The finalists were revealed on September 3. Nominees with small font weren't selected among the finalists.

Artist of the Year

 Agridoce
 Emicida
 Gaby Amarantos
 Rita Lee
 Vanguart

Video of The Year

 ConeCrewDiretoria - "Chama os Mulekes"
 Criolo - "Mariô"
 Edi Rock feat. Seu Jorge - "That's My Way"
 Emicida - "Zica, Vai Lá"
 Fresno - "Infinito"
 Gaby Amarantos - "Xirley"
 Garotas Suecas - "Não Se Perca Por Aí"
 Mallu Magalhães - "Velha e Louca"
 Racionais MC's - "Mil Faces De Um Homem Leal (Marighella)"
 Vanguart - "Mi Vida Eres Tu"

Best Album

 Agridoce - "Agridoce"
 BNegão & os Seletores de Frequência - "Sintoniza Lá"
 Cascadura - "Aleluia"
 Vanguart - "Boa Parte de Mim Vai Embora"
 Vivendo do Ócio - "O Pensamento é um Imã"

Best Song

 Emicida - "Dedo na Ferida"
 Rita Lee - "Reza"
 Vanguart - "Mi Vida Eres Tu"
 Vivendo do Ócio - "Nostalgia"
 Wado - "Com a Ponta dos Dedos"

Best Band
 ConeCrewDiretoria
 Forfun
 Gloria
 Restart
 Vanguart

Best Female Act

 Gaby Amarantos
 Gal Costa
 Mallu Magalhães
 Maria Gadú
 Rita Lee

Best Male Act

 Criolo
 Dinho Ouro Preto
 Emicida
 Lenine
 Projota

Best New Act

 ConeCrewDiretoria
 Projota
 Rancore

Best Album Art

 Agridoce - "Agridoce"
 Autoramas - "Música Crocante"
 Gaby Amarantos - "Treme"
 Vanguart - "Boa Parte de Mim Vai Embora"
 Zeca Baleiro - "O Disco do Ano"

MTV Bet

 RAPadura Xique Chico
 Soulstripper
 O Terno
 Lemoskine
 Selvagens à Procura de Lei

Exclusive categories for popular vote

Hit of the Year
 Agridoce - "Dançando"
 ConeCrewDiretoria - "Chama os Mulekes"
 CW7 - "Tudo Que Eu Sinto"
 Emicida - "Zica, Vai Lá"
 Forfun - "Largo dos Leões"
 O Teatro Mágico - "Nosso Pequeno Castelo"
 Projota - "Desci a Ladeira/Pode se Envolver"
 Rashid - "Quero Ver Segurar"
 Restart - "Menina Estranha"
 Strike - "Fluxo Perfeito"

Best International Act
 Demi Lovato
 Jay-Z & Kanye West
 Justin Bieber
 Katy Perry
 Lana Del Rey
 Maroon 5
 Nicki Minaj
 One Direction
 Rihanna
 Taylor Swift

Performances

 Planet Hemp (Pre-show Performance) - performed "Dig Dig Dig", "Fazendo a Cabeça", "Legalize Já", "A Culpa é de Quem?" and "Mantenha o Respeito"
 Marcelo D2 (Opening Performance) - performed "Abre Alas"
 Emicida feat. Rashid, Iggor Cavalera, Lúcio Maia e Joe - performed "Dedo na ferida"
 Projota - performed "Desci a Ladeira/Pode se Envolver" / ConeCrewDiretoria - performed "Chama os Mulekes"
 Agridoce - performed "Please Please Please Let Me Get What I Want"
 Karina Buhr - performed "Cara Palavra"
 Bonde do Rolê feat. Karol Konká - performed "Brazilian Boys"
 Gal Costa - performed "Neguinho"
 Racionais MC's (Closing Performance) - performed "Cores e Valores", "Eu Sou 157", "Negro Drama", "Mil Faces de Um Homem Leal (Marighella)", "That's My Way" and "Da Ponte pra Cá" (feat. Dexter, DJ Cia and Helião from RZO, Du Bronk’s and Negreta from Rosana Bronks, and Seu Jorge).

Appearances
 Chuck Hipolitho e Gaía Passarelli - introduced Planet Hemp
 Lucas Stegmann and Deco Neves - introduced Marcelo D2
 Criolo - presented Best New Artist
 Ellen Jabour - introduced Val Marchiori and Dani Calabresa's appearance
 Val Marchiori and Dani Calabresa as Narcisa Tamborindeguy - presented Best Album
 Bob Burnquist - presented Best International Artist
 Didi Effe and Titi Muller - introduced Karina Buhr
 Eduardo Sterblitch as "O Melhor do Melhor do Mundo" (The Best of the Best of the World - a character from "Pânico na Band")
 PC Siqueira and Bento Ribeiro - presented Best Album Art
 Daniela Cicarelli - presented Best Male Artist
 Helio Flanders, from Vanguart, and Emerson Sheik - introduced Projota and ConeCrewDiretoria
 Tatá Werneck as Roxxane (a "Comédia MTV" character) and Paulinho Serra (only voice) - presented MTV Bet
 Negra Li and Lucas Silveira - introduced Agridoce
 Paulinho Serra and Jana Rosa - introduced Bonde do Rolê
 Brothers of Brazil (Supla and João Suplicy) - presented Best Song
 João Lucas & Marcelo and Bruno Sutter as Detonator - presented Hit of The Year
 Arthur Zanetti, Sarah Menezes and Sheila Castro - presented Video of The Year
 Os Gêmeos - introduced Emicida
 Patrícia Abravanel and Mônica Iozzi - presented Best Female Act
 Bnegão e Gaby Amarantos - introduced Gal Costa
 Marcelo Adnet - presented Act of The Year
 Neymar - introduced Racionais MC's
 Emicida - closed the awards

External links
 MTV Brasil's Official Website
 VMB 2012 Hot Site

MTV Video Music Brazil